Thomas Gilbert Locken (born October 16, 1942, in Duluth, Minnesota) is an American curler.

He is a two-time  and a two-time United States men's curling champion (1974, 1978).

He played at the 1988 Winter Olympics when curling was a demonstration sport, USA men's team finished on fourth place.

Awards
 United States Curling Association Hall of Fame:
 1994 (as curler);
 2017 (with all 1974 world champions team: skip Bud Somerville, third Bob Nichols and second Bill Strum).
 2017 (with all 1978 world champions team: skip Bob Nichols, third Bill Strum and lead Bob Christman).

Teams

References

External links

Video: 

Living people
1942 births
People from Duluth, Minnesota
American male curlers
World curling champions
American curling champions
Curlers at the 1988 Winter Olympics
Olympic curlers of the United States